Córrego Grande Biological Reserve is a biological reserve spanning the boundary of Bahia and Espírito Santo, Brazil.

Location

The Córrego Grande Biological Reserve covers parts of the municipalities of Mucuri, Bahia, and Conceição da Barra, Espírito Santo.
It is named after the river of the same name that flows through the reserve from west to east.
The climate is tropical, warm and mostly humid, with one or two dry months.
There are some species unique to the reserve, including three species of hummingbird.

Protected species include northern brown howler (Alouatta guariba guariba), jaguar (Panthera onca), red-browed amazon (Amazona rhodocorytha), white-necked hawk (Buteogallus lacernulatus), black-headed berryeater (Carpornis melanocephala), red-billed curassow (Crax blumenbachii), banded cotinga (Cotinga maculata), great-billed hermit (Phaethornis malaris) and ochre-marked parakeet (Pyrrhura cruentata).

History

It is managed by the Chico Mendes Institute for Biodiversity Conservation.
It became part of the Central Atlantic Forest Ecological Corridor, created in 2002.
The Biological Reserve is a "strict nature reserve" under IUCN protected area category Ia.
It tries to preserve the biota and other natural attributes without human interference.
It was established to protect part of the last remaining rainforest zone of the Atlantic Forest.

In January 2014 the Federal Public Ministry in Espírito Santo gained a court ruling that ICMBio had 180 days to delimit buffer zones around the Córrego Grande Biological Reserve as well as the nearby  Rio Preto National Forest and the  Córrego do Veado Biological Reserve. 
A buffer zone is an area around a conservation unit where human activity is subject to various rules and restrictions.

References

Sources

1989 establishments in Brazil
Biological reserves of Brazil
Protected areas of Espírito Santo
Protected areas of Bahia
Protected areas established in 1989
Protected areas of the Atlantic Forest